The 2006 Speed World Challenge season was the 17th season of the SCCA Pro Racing Speed World Challenge. It began on March 15 at Sebring International Raceway and ended on October 21 at Road Atlanta after ten rounds.

Schedule

Results

References

External links
World Challenge Official Website

Speed World Challenge
GT World Challenge America